Folkingham is an English village and civil parish on the northern edge of the South Kesteven district of Lincolnshire. The civil and ecclesiastical parishes cover the same area. The 2001 Census gave a population of 729, rising to 796 at the 2011 census, and estimated at 795 in 1919.

Topography and development
This former town is attractively situated in a wide rolling landscape, just up from the fen edge, on the northern incline of an east–west stream valley. The settlement is centred on a large Market Place, positioned between a church on high land to the NW and a former baronial castle on low land to the SE. The modern A15 runs through the market area, rather than bypassing the settlement as at Aslackby and Osbournby, taking a dramatic right-angled turn at its NW corner.

The earliest settlement was probably on the high promontory overlooking stream valleys close to the church. It is likely this was linked to Roman roads (King Street and Mareham Lane) on either side via an east–west route running along what is now West Street and Sleaford Road. The castle site on low-lying land to the SE probably evolved from a pre-Conquest fortified enclosure which was the administrative centre of the soke of Folkingham. A market area developed in between the church and castle and this became the site for weekly markets and seven annual fairs.

The Market Place, West Street and Sleaford Road were lined with houses, farms, shops and inns/public houses and this whole area was remodelled in the late 18th century by the Heathcote Family of Normanton (Rutland) who bought the manor in 1788. The most dramatic manifestation of this work was the refacading of The Greyhound Inn at the top of the Market Place. In recognition of its importance, this area became one of the first designated conservation areas in Lincolnshire in 1968.

The town was bypassed by the railway and declined in the Victorian period as the coaching trade collapsed and services and retailing moved to larger towns. The main development since has been the erection of council housing off West Street in the 1950s, followed by the private Churchfields estate behind, built between 1987 and 1997.

The modern village retains a pub, The New Inn on West Street, and a local shop in the Market Place.

Toponymy
Folkingham is an early Saxon place name and appears in the Domesday survey of 1086 as Folchingeham. Its meaning can be interpreted as the 'Homestead belonging to Folc(a) or the estate of the Folcingas'.

Folc, however, as in 'people or nation' was also used in the Anglo-Saxon period as a district name (e.g. Norfolk) and may have been related to the Scandinavian fylki, meaning district. Could folc, therefore, also refer to a territorial district which became the soke of Folkingham? Folkestone probably derives its name from 'Folca's Stone', which was a meeting place of a territorial area.

In the mid-18th century an alternative spelling of 'Falkingham' was introduced, perhaps in an effort to make the place name sound more genteel – its correct pronunciation is 'Fokingham'. This variant became predominant in the 19th century, but fell out of favour in the early 20th century.

Early history
It is likely that Folkingham originated as an Anglo-Saxon settlement in the sixth century, developing into a regionally important royal soke centre, or multiple estate by the eighth century. Its location was obviously attractive to these settlers, being on a promontory above stream valleys between the Kesteven forest and sea access via the fens to the Wash. It was also close to two Roman roads (Mareham Lane and King Street) which led to Lincoln, which still had regional significance. It is probable that Folkingham was the southern centre of the territory of the Billingas people, whose name is reflected in local place names, such as Billingborough.

In 679 the region was conquered by Mercia, bringing it into the sphere of Mercian royal interest. A royal nunnery at Stow Green, off Mareham Lane founded by Æthelthryth, was entrusted to St Werberg by King Æthelred of Mercia. It is likely that King Æthelred developed nearby Folkingham into a soke centre, or multiple estate, in this period with a minster church dedicated to the popular St Andrew. The Soke of Folkingham, which grew into an estate of over 23 dependent villages, was roughly analogous with that of the later Wapentake of Aveland, which must have evolved from it. The minster status of the church is reflected in the numerous dedications to St Andrew within the soke.

It is likely that early settlement was on the highest ground of the promontory around the minster church (current site of St Andrew's Church). This settlement lay north of an east–west route linking it to the Roman roads on each side, which is still discernible in the modern road configuration of West Street and Sleaford Road.

History
A castle was built in the 12th century by Gilbert de Gant, Earl of Lincoln and enlarged by Henry Beaumont in the 14th century. He was given a licence to crenellate it in 1312. The last documentary record of occupation of this castle dates from 1372. John Leland described it as a ruin in 1535, in which state it survived until the Civil war. The site was later used as the village house of correction.

In the late 18th century, Folkingham market place was used for stacking timber. Around it was a horse pond, a market cross and a small town hall. The market place was divided by chains into areas for sheep, cattle, horses and poultry, and for the sale of farm produce and other wares. In 1788 the third Richard Wynne, then lord of the manor, was in financial difficulties and sold off the estate to Sir Gilbert Heathcote, whose great-grandfather, the first baronet, was a member of Parliament, Lord Mayor of London and governor of the Bank of England. When Sir Gilbert acquired the estate he wanted to transform Folkingham into a small market town. His changes included clearing the market place and having it equipped to cater for the stage coaches using the main London to Lincoln road which passed through.

Folkingham (then Falkingham) was the birthplace of Elizabeth Wynne Fremantle (1779–1857), the main author of The Wynne Diaries.

The Falkingham Gas Light Company was founded in 1863. The installation almost certainly used a Water gas or combined Water Gas/Producer gas system to produce gas from coal. No large-scale plant was installed in the village.

In 1940 RAF Folkingham, to the south-west of the village, began use as a Second World War airfield. It provided for troop carrier and airborne units and acted as a decoy airfield. During the 1950s and 1960s it was occupied by Bomber Command as a ballistic missile base. It is no longer in service.

Notable buildings

The House of Correction
In the early 19th century Folkingham was part of Quarter Sessions, the higher court that dispensed justice for the area, which explains why a House of Correction, or minor prison, was built. It was constructed on the site of Folkingham Castle. The surviving Grade II* listed buildings consist of the original 19th-century governor's house and gateway, dating from 1808 and 1825. It was closed in 1878 but was taken over in about 1980 by the Landmark Trust, which converted the Gateway into a holiday home.

The Greyhound
The Greyhound, once a coaching inn, dates back to 1650. It has since been converted into flats. It is a Grade II* listed building.

Parish church
The Church of England parish church of Saint Andrew originates from the late 12th century and was largely completed by the late 15th, with restorations carried out in 1825, 1858 and 1860. It has early Decorated Gothic arcades and a mainly Early English chancel, with a Norman pier where there was an opening into a chantry chapel. On the south side of the church are the remains of stocks and a whipping-post. The church is a Grade I listed building.

The church is a prominent feature of the village, but is inconspicuous from the Market Place. In 2006 gale force winds blew down two of the four pinnacles, one of which fell onto the roof causing damaging costing more than £100,000 to repair. Folkingham parish is part of the South Lafford Group of parishes in the Lafford Deanery, Diocese of Lincoln.

Folkingham Manor
Folkingham Manor House is located just off the Market place in the centre of Folkingham. It was built for Lord Clinton in the 17th century, out of stone taken from the castle/

Public transport
There is a daily express coach service to London and Hull. There are one to three buses per weekday to Grantham, one per weekday to Bourne and Sleaford, and an extra Sleaford run on schooldays. The nearest railway station is at Heckington (.

Lincolnshire County Council operates a pre-booking bus service from the village to nearby towns and back.

Notable people 

 Elizabeth Wynne Fremantle (1779–1857), the main author of The Wynne Diaries.
 Ethel Rudkin (1893-1985), folklorist and archaeologist, married George Rudkin from the village.

References

External links

"Folkingham (also Falkingham)", Genuki.org.uk. Retrieved 31 July 2011
Folkingham, homepages.which.net. Retrieved 31 July 2011
Folkingham, Lincolnshire, astoft.co.uk. Retrieved 31 July 2011
Folkingham Castle, everingham.com. Retrieved 31 July 2011 
"The Parliamentary Gazetteer’s Summary of Folkingham, 1843", The Bourne Archive. Retrieved 31 July 2011
"Britain turns out the supercar", Pathe News: BRM car tested at Folkingham aerodrome. Retrieved 31 July 2011

Folkingham village video. Retrieved 18 December 2010

Villages in Lincolnshire
Civil parishes in Lincolnshire
South Kesteven District